Lubiatów-Międzychód-Grotów oil field is a Polish oil field that was discovered in 1993. It is one of the biggest on-shore oil field of Poland. It began production in 1994 and produces oil.

References

Energy in Poland
Oil fields of Poland
Strzelce-Drezdenko County